{{Infobox album
| name       = Easy Living
| type       = Album
| artist     = Ike Quebec
| cover      = Easy Living (Ike Quebec album).jpg
| alt        =
| released   = 1987
| recorded   = January 20, 1962
| venue      =
| studio     = Van Gelder Studio, Englewood Cliffs, NJ
| genre      = Jazz
| length     = 56:52
| label      = Blue NoteBST 84103
| producer   = Alfred Lion
| prev_title = Blue & Sentimental
| prev_year  = 1961
| next_title = Soul Samba
| next_year  = 1962
| misc       = {{Extra album cover
 | header  = Alternative cover
 | type    = Album
 | cover   = Congo Lament.jpg
 | border  =
 | alt     =
 | caption = Congo Lament (LT 1089)}}
}}Easy Living is an album by American saxophonist Ike Quebec recorded in 1962, but not released on the Blue Note label until 1987. The album collects all the material recorded in January 1962, five tracks from which were released in 1981 as Congo Lament.

Reception

The Allmusic review by Steve Huey awarded the album 4½ stars and stated: "The mood isn't as unified as some of his carefully calibrated romantic dates, but Easy Living offers the two strongest sides of Quebec's musical personality in one place, encapsulating a great deal of what he did best".
The Easy Living LP did not contain all the sextet tracks (#1-5) from the Congo Lament session, which can also be found in Bennie Green's Mosaic box set.

Track listing

 "See See Rider" (Ma Rainey) - 9:01
 "Congo Lament" (Bennie Green) - 6:53
 "Que's Pills" (Turrentine) - 5:40
 "B.G.'s Groove Two" (Green) - 6:15 Bonus track on CD reissue
 "I.Q. Shuffle" (Quebec) - 9:47 Bonus track on CD reissue
 "I've Got a Crush on You" (Gershwin, Gershwin) - 6:51
 "Nancy (With the Laughing Face)" (Jimmy Van Heusen, Phil Silvers) - 7:25
 "Easy Living" (Ralph Rainger, Leo Robin) - 5:00

Personnel
Ike Quebec - tenor saxophone
Bennie Green - trombone (tracks 1-5)
Stanley Turrentine - tenor saxophone (tracks 1-5)
Sonny Clark - piano
Milt Hinton - bass
Art Blakey - drums

References

Blue Note Records albums
Ike Quebec albums
1987 albums
Albums recorded at Van Gelder Studio
Albums produced by Alfred Lion